Glyoxylate and dicarboxylate metabolism describes a variety of reactions involving glyoxylate or dicarboxylates.  Glyoxylate is the conjugate base of glyoxylic acid, and within a buffered environment of known pH such as the cell cytoplasm these terms can be used almost interchangeably, as the gain or loss of a hydrogen ion is all that distinguishes them, and this can occur in the aqueous environment at any time.  Likewise dicarboxylates are the conjugate bases of dicarboxylic acids, a general class of organic compounds containing two carboxylic acid groups, such as oxalic acid or succinic acid.

A compact graphical description of major biochemical reactions involved can be found at KEGG  This provides information on the relevant enzymes and details the relationship with several other metabolic processes: glycine, serine, and threonine metabolism which provides hydroxypyruvate and glyoxylate, purine metabolism which provides glyoxylate, pyruvate metabolism which provides (S)-malate and formate, carbon fixation which consumes 3-phospho-D-glycerate and provides D-ribulose 1,5-P2, ascorbate and aldarate metabolism which shares tartronate-semialdehyde, nitrogen metabolism which shares formate, pyruvate metabolism and the citrate cycle which share oxaloacetate, and vitamin B6 metabolism which consumes glycolaldehyde.

The glyoxylate cycle describes an important subset of these reactions involved in biosynthesis of carbohydrates from fatty acids or two-carbon precursors which enter the system as acetyl-coenzyme A.  Its crucial enzymes are isocitrate lyase and malate synthase.  However, alternate pathways have been proposed in organisms lacking isocitrate lyase.

References 

Biochemistry